Barra (or) is an island in the Outer Hebrides, Scotland, and the second southernmost inhabited island there, after the adjacent island of Vatersay to which it is connected by a short causeway. The island is named after Saint Finbarr of Cork.

In 2011, the population was 1,174. Gaelic is widely spoken, and at the 2011 Census, there were 761 Gaelic speakers (62% of the population).

Geology 
In common with the rest of the Western Isles, Barra is formed from the oldest rocks in Britain, the Lewisian gneiss, which dates from the Archaean eon. Some of the gneiss in the east of the island is noted as being pyroxene-bearing. Layered textures or foliation in this metamorphic rock is typically around 30° to the east or northeast. Palaeoproterozoic age metadiorites and metatonalites forming a part of the East Barra Meta-igneous Complex occur around Castlebay as they do on the neighbouring islands of Vatersay and Flodday. A few metabasic dykes intrude the gneiss in the east.
The island is traversed by a handful of normal faults running WNW-ESE and by west-facing thrust faults bringing nappes of gneiss from the east. Blown sand masks the bedrock around Borve and Allisdale as it does west of Barra airport. Peat deposits are mapped across Beinn Chliaid and Beinn Sgurabhal in the north of the island.

Geography 
A single-track road, the A888, runs around the coast of the southern part of the island following the flattest land and serving the many coastal settlements. The interior of the island here is hilly and uninhabited. The west and north of the island has white sandy beaches consisting of sand created from marine shells adjoining the grassed , while the southeast side has numerous rocky inlets. To the north a sandy peninsula runs to the beach airport and Eoligarry.

History

Early history
During the construction of a road in the 1990s, the discovery of a near-complete pottery beaker dating from 2500 BC established that there has been a human presence on Barra since the neolithic era. As well as pottery, a number of stone remains were found, including a neolithic "work platform", which complement the several standing stones scattered around the island. In the hills to the north of Borve, there is a large chambered cairn, sited in a prominent position.

Beyond the main island, a Bronze Age cemetery is located on Vatersay, as well as an Iron Age broch; the remains of a similarly aged broch is located on the east of Barra itself. Remains of Bronze Age burials and Iron Age roundhouses were also discovered in sand dunes, near the hamlet of Allasdale, following storms in 2007. Occupation of Barra continued during the later Iron Age, as evidenced by the discovery of a wheelhouse from the end of the period, which was later re-occupied between the 3rd and 4th centuries, and again in the 7th and 8th centuries.

These occupations were followed in the 9th century by viking settlers, who gave the island at least part of its name. The latter is derived from two elements: Barr and Old Norse  ("island"). Barr may represent the Gaelic personal name . According to the ancient Grettis saga, the first viking to arrive was named Omund the Wooden-Leg.

Kingdom of the Isles
The Vikings established the Kingdom of the Isles throughout the Hebrides, including Barra. Following Norwegian unification, the Kingdom of the Isles became a crown dependency of the Norwegian king; to the Norwegians, it was Suðreyjar (meaning southern isles). Malcolm III of Scotland acknowledged in writing that they were not Scottish, and King Edgar quitclaimed any residual doubts. In the north of Barra, from this period survived a gravestone, on which a Celtic cross is present on one side, and runic inscriptions on the other.

In the mid 12th century, Somerled, a Norse-Gael of uncertain origin, launched a coup, which made Suðreyjar entirely independent. Following his death, Norwegian authority was nominally restored, but in practice, the kingdom was divided between Somerled's heirs, and the dynasty that Somerled had deposed (the Crovan dynasty). , a branch of Somerled's heirs, ruled Barra, as well as Uist, Eigg, Rùm, the Rough Bounds, Bute, Arran, and northern Jura.

In the 13th century, despite Edgar's quitclaim, Scottish forces attempted to conquer parts of Suðreyjar, culminating in the indecisive Battle of Largs. In 1266, the matter was settled by the Treaty of Perth, which transferred the whole of Suðreyjar to Scotland, in exchange for a very large sum of money. The Treaty expressly preserved the status of the rulers of Suðreyjar; the Clann Ruaidhri lands, excepting Bute, Arran, and Jura, became the Lordship of Garmoran, a quasi-independent crown dependency, rather than an intrinsic part of Scotland.

Lordship of Garmoran

In 1293, king John Balliol established the Sheriffdom of Skye, which included the Outer Hebrides. In 1343, King David II issued a further charter to Ruaidhrí's son, Raghnall, but Raghnall's assassination, just three years later, left Garmoran in the hands of Amy of Garmoran.

The southern parts of the Kingdom of the Isles had become the Lordship of the Isles, ruled by the MacDonalds (another group of Somerled's descendants). Amy married the MacDonald leader, John of Islay, but a decade later he divorced her, and married the king's niece instead (in return for a substantial dowry). As part of the divorce, John deprived his eldest son, Ranald, of the ability to inherit the Lordship of the Isles, in favour of a son by his new wife. As compensation, John granted Lordship of the Uists to Ranald's younger brother Godfrey and made Ranald Lord of the remainder of Garmoran.

On Ranald's death, disputes between Godfrey and his nephews led to an enormous amount of violence. In 1427, frustrated with the level of violence generally in the highlands, King James I demanded that highland leaders should attend a meeting at Inverness. On arrival, many of the leaders were seized and imprisoned; Alexander MacGorrie, son of Godfrey, was considered to be one of the two most reprehensible, and after a quick showtrial, was immediately executed. As Alexander had by now inherited Godfrey's de facto position as Lord of Garmoran, and in view of Ranald's heirs being no less responsible for the violence, King James declared the Lordship of Garmoran forfeit.

Lairds and pirates

Following the forfeiture, and in that same year, the Lord of the Isles granted Lairdship of Barra (and half of South Uist) to Giolla Adhamhnáin Mac Néill, Chief of Clan MacNeil.

Headquartering themselves at Kisimul Castle and making use of Birlinns, the MacNeils became famed for piracy after attacking English ships during the reign of Queen Elizabeth I. They were summoned by King James VI – King of Scotland – to answer for their behaviour. The Chief, Roderick MacNeil ("Rory the Turbulent"), argued that he thought King James would be pleased, since Queen Elizabeth had beheaded his mother Mary, Queen of Scots. Pleased, King James released him. 

The mainly Catholic population of the island was under serious threat during the Jacobite Uprising of 1745. According to Bishop John Geddes, "Early in the spring of 1746, some ships of war came to the coast of the isle of Barra and landed some men, who threatened they would lay desolate the whole island if the priest was not delivered up to them. Father 
James Grant, who was missionary then, and afterward Bishop, being informed of the threats in a safe retreat in which he was in a little island, surrendered himself, and was carried prisoner to Mingarry Castle on the Western coast (i.e. Ardnamurchan) where he was detained for some weeks."

After long imprisonment at Inverness and in a prison hulk in the Thames River, Father Grant was deported to the Netherlands and warned never to return to the British Isles. Like the other priests imprisoned with him, Father Grant did so almost immediately.

The descendants of the Clan Chiefs held on to Barra until 1838, when the island was sold to Colonel John Gordon of Cluny (for the sum of £38,050). Roderick MacNeil, Chief of the MacNeils, had already abandoned Kisimul Castle, and built a mansion in the north of Barra; the ensuing debt was one of the reasons he sold the island.

In common with many of the new Anglo-Scottish landlords, Colonel Gordon evicted most of the islanders to make way for sheep farming. Some of the displaced islanders variously went to the Scottish mainland. Others joined the Scottish diaspora in Australia, New Zealand, the United States, and Canada.

Gaelic traditional singer and Barra native Flora MacNeil later recalled one the best sources of the Gaelic songs she learned at local ceilidhs was her mother's cousin, Mary Johnstone. Johnstone's parents had moved to Mingulay after being evicted by Colonel Gordon's Factors and she returned to her ancestral island after Mingulay was abandoned in 1912. In later years, Johnstone would regularly visit the MacNeil family's croft near Castlebay and sing at the ceilidhs.

By far the worst mass evictions took place, according to Barra seanchaidh (historian) John "The Coddy" MacPherson, during the Highland Potato Famine of the 1840s. Many residents of Barra were unwillingly rounded up and forced by Colonel Gordon's Factors to board the Admiral, an immigrant ship anchored at Lochboisdale, South Uist, and which then set sail for Canada.

MacPherson later said of those who were evicted, "Now they were aboard, and they sailed away and it took them six months, I think, to get across from Lochboisdale to Quebec - or the St. Lawrence somewhere anyway. After that, there was nothing for them but trees and poverty, and those wretched fellows had to back it for life. Going through the hardships of the emigrants who went across the Atlantic in the Admiral, not many people would credit them today."

The MacNeil Chiefs were also among the migrants, settling at first in Canada, but moving to the United States by the 20th century. Barra was restored to MacNeil ownership in 1937 when the Barra estate, which encompassed most of the island, was bought by Robert Lister Macneil, an American. In 2000, his heir, Ian Roderick Macneil (another American), let Kisimul Castle to Historic Scotland, on a 1000-year lease (for a rental of £1 and a bottle of whisky, per annum). In 2003, he transferred ownership of the Barra Estate to the Scottish Government;. Under Scottish law, the inhabitants have the right to take possession of the estate themselves, if they so wish.

Having been flown unofficially for at least a decade, the island's flag received official recognition from the Lyon Court and the Flag Institute in November 2017. The design is a white Nordic cross on a green background.

Places of interest
The main village is Castlebay in a sheltered bay, where Kisimul Castle sits on a small islet not far from shore; giving the village its name. This is the main harbour.

A smaller medieval tower house, is in the middle of Loch St Clare on the west side of the island at Tangasdale.

The highest elevation on the island is Heaval, near the top of which is a prominent white marble statue of the Madonna and Child, called "Our Lady of the Sea", which was erected during the Marian year of 1954. The predominant faith on the island is Catholicism and the Catholic church dedicated to Our Lady of the Sea is apparent to those arriving at Castlebay.

Barra is connected by a modern causeway to the smaller island of Vatersay, population 90.

Economy 
Tourism provides the main income for the majority of islanders; the high season lasts from May to September. Thousands of people visit the island every year, the busiest times being during  & BarraFest in July. The  Heritage and Cultural Centre is located in Castlebay, next to Castlebay Community School. It has various exhibitions each year and is open throughout the year. In April 2020, Condé Nast Traveller summed up Barra as "a delightful little island with its own castle and beach airport" and recommended visiting the "high cliffs in the east and lovely beaches and bays in the west".

The Outer Hebrides Web site particularly recommended visits to sites "the iconic Kisimul Castle at Castlebay" and stopping to see the Barra seals at Seal Bay. The Explore Scotland tourism Web site also discusses the Barra Golf Club, Kisimul Castle, Barra Heritage and Cultural Centre, Heaval for exceptional views, Church of Our Lady Star of the Sea and Cille Bharra, the ancient graveyard.

According to the Scottish Government, "tourism is by far and away the mainstay industry" of the Outer Hebrides, "generating £65m in economic value for the islands, sustaining around 1000 jobs" The report adds that the "islands receive 219,000 visitors per year". The Outer Hebrides tourism bureau states that 10-15% of economic activity on the islands was made up of tourism in 2017. The agency states that the "exact split between islands is not possible" when calculating the number of visits, but "the approximate split is Lewis (45%), Uist (25%), Harris (20%), Barra (10%)".

Castlebay is the primary base for tourists, with a few hotels, a supermarket, bank and  petrol station. Explore Scotland stated in 2020 that the island was "also an ideal starting point for visiting and exploring the Uists and Benbecula".

In 2010, camping on the machair at the airport was banned due to erosion; this prompted crofters to provide areas on their crofts for visiting tourists. Boat trips to the neighbouring island of Mingulay are available during the summer season, and island-hopping plane trips are also available.

The Barratlantic factory, in Northbay is a fish and shellfish processing company. As of 2020, its main products were king scallops and langoustines but it was selling most types of white fish from the quayside. Their Web site indicated that the stock included "cod; haddock; skate; witches; megrims; turbot; Dover sole and monkfish which you can buy direct from the factory". The Hebridean Toffee Factory in Castlebay is one of the few manufacturers on Barra and it makes the products locally. According to Visit Scotland, the toffee can be ordered from anywhere in the world; "it is made to order and is usually shipped within 24 hours".

Isle of Barra Distillers was founded by Michael and Katie Morrison in 2016; their Barra Atlantic Gin was first sold in August 2017 and the company has expanded since then. As of early 2021, the distillery continued marketing gin, with great success. The plan for whisky was stated on its Web site as: "It is our goal to open the Islands first Single Malt Whisky Distillery within the next 2-3 years".

The Isle of Barra distillery was founded in 2003 as Uisge Beatha nan Eilean Ltd and became a Community Benefit Society in 2018 under the Co-operative and Community Benefit Societies Act 2014. In December 2012, four 6 kW wind turbines made by Proven (Proven were bought by Kingspan Group in 2011) were erected next to the reservoir Loch Uisge, which originally supplied the mains water to Castlebay. It is proposed that as much as possible of the raw materials, supply chain and labor to produce the whisky should remain as local as possible to minimise imports and maximise the benefit to the island's economy.

Media 
The island has featured in a variety of media.

Film and TV

Besides being regularly featured in various television programmes on the Scottish Gaelic channel BBC Alba since it began broadcasting in 2008, Barra has also been part of:

The 1949 Ealing Studios comedy Whisky Galore! was filmed on Barra. The film is based on the novel Whisky Galore by Sir Compton Mackenzie, itself a fictionalised telling of the story of the SS Politician, which ran aground with a cargo of some 50,000 cases of whisky on board in 1941. Mackenzie, who lived near the airport and died in 1972, is buried in a grave marked by a simple cross at  cemetery, which is situated a little way up the hillside overlooking Eoligarry jetty. The sequel Rockets Galore! was also filmed in and around the island.

The sitcom Dad's Army, broadcast from 1968 to 1977, Private Frazer claims to be from Barra, which he often describes as "a wild and lonely place".

Barra was featured on Time Team, in which archeologists excavated several Iron Age sites.

Barra was also featured in the 2006 Channel 5 documentary Extraordinary people: The Boy Who Lived Before, where a young boy named Cameron, who lived in Glasgow, claimed to have memories of past life on the island.

The island was the location for the fifth (2011) and sixth series (2012) of the BBC Two documentary An Island Parish documenting the arrival and subsequent experiences of a new Catholic priest on the island –  Father John Paul.

Books
The Franciscan priest, specialist in mystical theology and author Rayner Torkington wrote a book describing how he was influenced after a chance encounter on Barra by meeting a hermit called Peter Calvay who had lived on the island of Hellisay for a number of years in the first half of the twentieth century. The book titled ‘Peter Calvay, hermit: A personal rediscovery of prayer’ was first published in 1977 and has had at least eleven reprintings.

Torkington's book ‘Wisdom from the Western Isles: the making of a mystic’, published in 2008, also describes the author's meetings with Peter Calvay whilst he was staying on Barra.

Other
In 2008 the Barra RNLI Life Boat, Edna Windsor was featured on a series of stamps.

Sports 
Barra hosts an annual half-marathon called the Barrathon, which is part of the Western Isles Half Marathon series. This is accompanied by a shorter fun-run for families and younger children. A number of fund-raising events are held around this, including ceilidhs and dances.

There is also an annual hill race, in which participants run up Heaval (383 m) before returning to Castlebay Square. The fastest recorded time, set in 1987, is 26.25 minutes.

The Barra community holds an annual games on the island. The island golf club, has a 9-hole course that is claimed to be the furthest west in the United Kingdom. However, this title may be held by one of the courses near Enniskillen in Northern Ireland.

Tourists can also go sea kayaking or power kiting and fishing. Pony trekking available on the rare, native Eriskay Ponies.

Transport

Air

Barra's airport, near Northbay, uses the  cockle shell beach of Traigh Mhor, (Scottish Gaelic:  "The Great Beach") as a runway. Planes can land and take off only at low tide, so the timetable varies. Voted the world's most scenic landing location using a scheduled flight, Barra's airport is claimed to be the only airport in the world to have regular scheduled flights landing on a beach. As of 2019 Loganair advertises flights to Barra in the de Havilland Canada DHC-6 Twin Otter, aircraft travelling to and from Glasgow. There are usually flights every day of the week in the summer.

Sea
A large Ro-Ro Ferry runs between the island and Oban from the ferry terminal at Castlebay, and takes about 5 hours. This crossing takes around 40 minutes. Both are run by Caledonian MacBrayne.

Internal road

There are local buses, which use the circular A888 and the road to the northern ferry terminal to Eriskay and the airport, and usually coincide with flight times and ferry times.

(Barra and Vatersay Community) Ltd is a community-owned company whose aim is to support community development on Barra and Vatersay. The company is managed by a volunteer board of directors drawn from the membership. Membership is open to residents of the two islands whose names appear on the voting register.

At the time of construction, it was anticipated that the wind resource would make this one of the most productive 900 kW turbines in Western Europe.

Climate 
Barra has an oceanic climate, with mild temperatures year-round.

People from Barra 
 Flora MacNeil (1928—2015) Scottish Gaelic traditional singer and Barra native
 Mick MacNeil (b. 1958) Simple Minds keyboardist 1978–1990

Further reading
 John Lorne Campbell (1992), Tales from Barra: Told by The Coddy, Birlinn Limited.
 Edited by John Lorne Campbell (1936), The Book of Barra, Being accounts of the Island of Barra in the Outer Hebrides written by various authors at various times, together with unpublished letters and other matter relating to the Island. Published by G. Routledge and Sons Ltd. and printed by the Edinburgh Press in 1936. Republished by Acair in 1998
 Ealasaid Chaimbeul, (1982), Air Mo Chuairt/My Journey, Memories of an Island School Teacher,

See also 

 List of islands of Scotland
 List of places in the Western Isles

Notes

References

External links 

 
 Explore the Isle of Barra
 Isle of Barra community website
 National Library of Scotland: Scottish Screen Archive (1950s archive film about the island of Barra)

 
Clan MacNeil
Islands of the Outer Hebrides